Loyd Blankenship (born 1965), better known by his pseudonym The Mentor, is a computer hacker and writer. He has been active since the 1970s, when he was a member of the hacker groups Extasyy Elite and Legion of Doom.

Writings

Hacker Manifesto
He is the author of The Conscience of a Hacker (also known as The Hacker Manifesto); the essay was written after he was arrested and was published in the ezine Phrack. Since the essay's publication in 1986, it has been the subject of numerous panels and T-shirts.

Role-playing games
Blankenship was hired by Steve Jackson Games in 1989. He authored the cyberpunk role-playing sourcebook GURPS Cyberpunk, the manuscript of which was seized in a 1990 raid of Steve Jackson Games headquarters by the U.S. Secret Service. The raid resulted in the subsequent legal case Steve Jackson Games, Inc. v. United States Secret Service.

References

External links 
 ElfQrin.com Interview with The Mentor (July 31, 2000)
 
 "The Conscience of a Hacker", published in Phrack Volume 1 Issue 7

1965 births
GURPS writers
Hacking (computer security)
Legion of Doom (hacker group)
Living people